is a Japanese manga series written and illustrated by Hitomi Takano. It was first serialized in Futabasha's Monthly Action from December 2015 to December 2017. It was then transferred to Kodansha's Weekly Young Magazine, being serialized from May 2018 to October 2020. In North America, the manga is licensed for English release by Vertical.

Publication
My Boy is written and illustrated by Hitomi Takano. The manga was serialized in Futabasha's Monthly Action from December 25, 2015, to December 25, 2017. In April 2018, it was announced that the series would be transferred to Kodansha's Weekly Young Magazine, starting on May 28 of the same year, and despite being serialized in a weekly magazine, it would keep its monthly basis release. The manga finished on October 26, 2020. Futabasha collected its chapters in four tankōbon volumes, released from June 11, 2016, to December 12, 2017. Kodansha re-released these four volumes between June 6 and October 5, 2018, and published the ninth and final volume on December 4, 2020.

In North America, Vertical announced the English release of the manga in July 2017. The first volume was released on April 10, 2018.

Volume list

Reception
As of November 2018, the manga had 1.1 million copies in circulation. The series ranked #6 on the "Nationwide Bookstore Employees' Recommended Comics of 2017". The manga was nominated for the 10th Manga Taishō awards in January 2017, receiving 20 points from the Manga Taisho awards' "Executive Committee". The series placed third at the 3rd Next Manga Awards in the comics division for manga published in print book format in 2017. The 2017 edition of Takarajimasha's Kono Manga ga Sugoi! guidebook ranked the series #2 on its list of manga for male readers.

References

External links
 

Futabasha manga
Kodansha manga
Seinen manga